Prince Daddy & the Hyena is an American rock band from Albany, New York, formed in 2014. They have released three full-length albums and four extended plays.

History

Formation and early years
Prince Daddy and the Hyena was formed in 2014 when Kory Gregory, Alex Ziembiec and Zakariya Houacine were inspired to start a band after seeing Rozwell Kid live. According to Gregory, Rozwell Kid was a substantial influence on much of his early songwriting. The band's name is derived from a game that Gregory played with the band's merch person, Luis Wiest, at recess in elementary school.

The band met lead guitarist Cameron Handford through house shows and mutual friends eventually leading up to his joining of the band.

.
Prince Daddy & the Hyena began in 2014 with the release of an extended play titled Skip Cutscenes! Blow Loud!. In 2015, the band went into the headroom studio with Joe Reinhart (Hop Along, Algernon Cadwallader) and recorded their first album, but the release was delayed several times.

In the mean time, the band wrote, recorded and released the EP Adult Summers. 

Their first full-length album I Thought You Didn't Even Like Leaving was finally released in 2016 on Broken World Media. I Thought You Didn’t Like Leaving was written during Gregory’s high school days, the album was about working at Panera Bread and “being so sad about your friends leaving you that you lay in bed, eat Cheetos, and smoke weed.

In 2017 Ziembiec left the band on good terms due to exhaustion from touring. Daniel Gorham from Pictures of Vernon took over on drums.

Cosmic Thrill Seekers
In 2019, the band released its second full-length album titled Cosmic Thrill Seekers on Counter Intuitive Records, and embarked on several extensive tours in support of the album. The band went on tour Europe with Oso Oso in further support of the record in the fall of 2019. In 2020, the band embarked on their co-headlining tour with Oso Oso with support from Just Friends.

Self-titled album
In 2021, the band signed to Pure Noise Records and released the single "Curly Q." which Gregory wrote for his nephew. 

In 2022, they announced their forthcoming third album, Prince Daddy & the Hyena, to release on April 15. The album is conceptually about the fear of death, and was inspired by a van crash the band experienced. The album was also supported by the singles "A Random Exercise In Impermanence (The Collector)," "El Dorado," and "Shoelaces," as well as a headlining tour throughout the US with Macseal, Insignificant Other, and California Cousins.

On November 2022, they announced original drummer Alex Ziembiec’s passing.

On February 2023 they embarked on a co-headlining tour with Drug Church, with support from Anxious and Webbed Wing.

Musical style
The band's sound has been described as indie rock with punk and "slacker" influences. Frontman Kory Gregory cites Weezer, the Strokes, Jeff Rosenstock, and Green Day as major influences on the sound. In an interview with The Fader, Gregory described the sound on the band's second album Cosmic Thrill Seekers as "the soundtrack to a Disney film played by a punk rock band."

Band members
Current
Korneilious "Kory" Jophus Gregory – vocals, guitar (2014–present)
Cameron "Cambo" Hanford – guitar (2014–present)
Daniel “Podwick” Gorham – drums, vocals (2017–present)

Touring
 Cole "Macseal" Syzilagyi - Bass (2022–present)
 David "Hooplah Jones" Rerhig – trumpet (2022)
 J Nasty - Bass (2022-present)

Past
Zakariya "Hardly Knew Yee" Houacine – bass (2014–2019)
Alex "Al Al Bean" Ziembiec – drums (2014–2017; died 2022)
Adam Dasilva – Bass (2020–2022)

Discography
Studio albums
I Thought You Didn't Even Like Leaving (2016, Broken World Media)
Cosmic Thrill Seekers (2019, Counter Intuitive Records)
Prince Daddy & The Hyena (2022, Pure Noise Records)
EPs
 Skip Cutscenes! Blow Loud! (2014, Wallflower Records)
 Adult Summers (2015, Broken World Media)
Splits
 Prince Daddy & The Hyena/Just Friends (2016, Broken World Media)
 Now That's What I Call Music Vol. 420 (2017, Counter Intuitive Records)
Singles

 Adult Summers Pt. 2 (2015, Broken World Media)
 *HIDDEN TRACK* (2015, Broken World Media)
 I Thought You Didn’t Even Like Leaving (2016, Broken World Media)
 Hundo Pos (2016, Broken World Media)
 I Forgot To Take My Meds Today (2017, Broken World Media)
 I Lost My Life (2019, Counter Intuitive Records)
 Lauren (Track 2) (2019, Counter Intuitive Records)
 Fuckin’ A (2019, Counter Intuitive Records)
 Prototype of The Ultimate Life-form (2019, Counter Intuitive Records)
 Curly Q (2021, Pure Noise Records)
 A Random Exercise in Impermanence (The Collector) (2022, Pure Noise Records)
 El Dorado (2022, Pure Noise Records)
 Shoelaces (2022, Pure Noise Records)

References

Musical groups from Albany, New York
Musical groups established in 2015
2015 establishments in New York (state)